The 1950-51 Segunda División de México season was the first tournament in this competition. It counted with the participation of seven teams.

Teams

League standings

Results

Moves
Zacatepec was promoted to First Division.
San Sebastián was relegated from First Division.
After this season Moctezuma; La Piedad and La Concepción joined the league.

References

Mexico 1950/51 RSSSF
Mexico - List of Final Tables Second Division (1950-1995)

Mex
1950–51 in Mexican football
Segunda División de México seasons